Whirlwind Peak is a  mountain summit in southwestern British Columbia, Canada.

Description
Whirlwind Peak is located in Garibaldi Provincial Park, in the Garibaldi Ranges of the Coast Mountains. It is the eighth-highest point of the Fitzsimmons Range, which is a subset of the Garibaldi Ranges. Precipitation runoff from the peak drains into tributaries of the Cheakamus River.

History
The peak was so named by the Garibaldi Park Board because of evidence that a destructive windstorm had levelled an area of trees on the peak's slopes. The mountain's toponym was officially adopted on September 2, 1930, by the Geographical Names Board of Canada.

Climate

Based on the Köppen climate classification, Whirlwind Peak is located in the marine west coast climate zone of western North America. Most weather fronts originate in the Pacific Ocean, and travel east toward the Coast Mountains where they are forced upward by the range (Orographic lift), causing them to drop their moisture in the form of rain or snowfall. As a result, the Coast Mountains experience high precipitation, especially during the winter months in the form of snowfall. Winter temperatures can drop below −20 °C with wind chill factors below −30 °C. This climate supports the Overlord Glacier on the north slope of the peak. The months July through September offer the most favorable weather for climbing Whirlwind Peak.

See also
 Geography of British Columbia

References

External links
 Weather: Whirlwind Peak
 Whirlwind Peak (photo): Flickr

Garibaldi Ranges
Two-thousanders of British Columbia
Pacific Ranges
Sea-to-Sky Corridor
New Westminster Land District